Nataliya Gaponovich (born 25 October 1972) is a Russian sailor. She competed in the women's 470 event at the 2004 Summer Olympics.

References

External links
 

1972 births
Living people
Russian female sailors (sport)
Olympic sailors of Russia
Sailors at the 2004 Summer Olympics – 470
People from Nikopol, Ukraine